Jesús Tordesillas Fernández (28 January 1893 – 24 March 1973) was a Spanish film actor. He appeared in 94 films between 1921 and 1973. He starred in the film Reckless which was entered into the 1951 Cannes Film Festival.

Selected filmography

 Flor de España o La historia de un torero (1925)
 Currito of the Cross (1926) – Currito de la Cruz
 Madrid se divorcia (1935)
 The Strange Marchioness (1939)
 Marianela (1940) – Pablo's Father
 The Unloved Woman (1940) – Esteban
 The Queen's Flower Girl (1940)
 Pepe Conde (1941) – Don Gaspar
 Idilio en Mallorca (1943)
 Febbre (1943) – L'avvocato
 Dora la espía (1943)
 The Nail (1944) – Presidente del Consejo
 Eugenia de Montijo (1944) – Próspero Mérimée
 Lola Montes (1944) – Luis I de Baviera
 A Shadow at the Window (1945) – Pedro Alar
 Espronceda (1945) – Miguel de los Santos
 Viento de siglos (1945)
 Su última noche (1945) – Narrador
 White Mission (1946) – Padre Urcola
 Leyenda de feria (1946)
 La mantilla de Beatriz (1946) – Calderón de la Barca
 El crimen de Pepe Conde (1946) – Marqués
 Un drama nuevo (1946) – Shakespeare
 Las inquietudes de Shanti Andía (1947) – Patricio Allen
 Serenata española (1947) – Robert Brighton
 The Captain's Ship (1947) – Don Antonio
 Lola Leaves for the Ports (1947) – Don Diego
 Leyenda de Navidad (1947) – William Scrooge
 Madness for Love (1948) – Don Filiberto de Vere
 Jalisco Sings in Seville (1949) – Don Manuel Vargas
 Neutrality (1949) – Spanischer Kapitän
 El sótano (1949) – Padre Ramón
 Pequeñeces... (1950) – Padre Cifuentes
 Woman to Woman (1950) – Antonio – Isabel's father
 Agustina of Aragon (1950) – Coronel Torres
 Vendaval (1950) – Don Juan Fernández
 Reckless (1951) – Don Carlos Mendoza
 The Lioness of Castille (1951) – Don López
 Séptima página (1951) – Arrosti
 Dawn of America (1951) – Fray Juan Pérez
 Doña Francisquita (1952) – Don Matías
 Jeromin (1953) – Carlos V
 El indiano (1955) – Duque
 La lupa (1955) – Padre Miguel
 El piyayo (1956) – D. Carlos
 Afternoon of the Bulls (1956) – Luis Montes
 The Legion of Silence (1956) – Josef
 Dimentica il mio passato (1957)
 Spanish Affair (1957) – Sotelo
 La guerra empieza en Cuba (1957) – Marqués
 El andén (1957) – Don Javier
 The Warrior and the Slave Girl (1958) – Crisippo
 Where Are You Going, Alfonso XII? (1959) – Ceferino
 Venta de Vargas (1959) – French General
 Una Gran señora (1959) – Richard Chrysler
 S.O.S., abuelita (1959)
 Listen To My Song (1959) – Marqués de Alvar, abuelo de Joselito
 The Little Colonel (1960) – Don Esteban
 Un ángel tuvo la culpa (1960) – Falso Conde de Campoy
 Margarita se llama mi amor (1961)
 El pobre García (1961)
 Ella y los veteranos (1961) – Joaquín Aguirre
 Fray Escoba (1961) – Padre Prior
 Kill and Be Killed (1962) – Farmacéutico
 Teresa de Jesús (1962)
 Zorro the Avenger (1962) – Raimundo
 Mentirosa (1962)
 Shades of Zorro (1962) – Raimundo
 Magic Fountain (1963) – José Serrano
 Plaza de oriente (1963)
 Cristo negro (1963) – Padre Braulio
 The Sign of the Coyote (1963) – Don Cesar's Father
 Juicio contra un ángel (1964)
 Black Angel of the Mississippi (1964) – David Edwards
 Tintin and the Blue Oranges (1964) – Don Lope (uncredited)
 El señor de La Salle (1964) – Juez
 Per un pugno nell'occhio (1965) – Enterrador
 A Coffin for the Sheriff (1965) – Slim, the Old Man
 El proscrito del río Colorado (1965) – Cristobal Riaño
 Spies Strike Silently (1966) – Prof. Roland Bergson
 Acompáñame (1966) – Pantaleón
 Dos hombres van a morir (1968) – Mormon Leader (uncredited)
 A Stranger in Paso Bravo (1968)
 Hard Contract (1969) – Minor Role (uncredited)
 Los escondites (1969)
 El relicario (1970)
 ¿Es usted mi padre? (1971)
 The Horsemen (1971) – Little Governor (uncredited)
 In nome del padre, del figlio e della Colt (1971) – (uncredited)
 Delusions of Grandeur (1971) – (uncredited)
 The Guerrilla (1973) – Don Alonso
 La llamaban La Madrina (1973)
 Con la música a otra parte (1974) – Mr. Jazz

References

External links

1893 births
1973 deaths
Spanish male film actors
Spanish male silent film actors
Male actors from Madrid
20th-century Spanish male actors